The 1975–76 Northern Football League season was the 78th in the history of Northern Football League, a football competition in England.

Clubs

Division One featured 19 clubs which competed in the league last season, along with one new club:
 Horden Colliery Welfare, joined from the Wearside Football League

League table

References

External links
 Northern Football League official site

Northern Football League seasons
1975–76 in English football leagues